The Journal of Petroleum Geology is a quarterly peer-reviewed scientific journal covering the geology of petroleum and natural gas. It was established in 1978 and is published by Wiley-Blackwell on behalf of Scientific Press Ltd. The editor-in-chief is Christopher Tiratsoo (Scientific Press Ltd.). According to the Journal Citation Reports, the journal has a 2017 impact factor of 1.872, ranking it 99th out of 190 journals in the category "Geosciences, Multidisciplinary".

References

External links

Petroleum geology
Geology journals
Publications established in 1978
Quarterly journals
Wiley-Blackwell academic journals
English-language journals